The Predator Nominate is the third extended play by American indie rock band Brainiac, released on January 20, 2023, through Touch & Go Records. It is the band's first release of new music in nearly 26 years, and consists of old demos that were recorded for the band's planned major label debut on Interscope Records, prior to the death of frontman Timmy Taylor in May 1997. Guitarist John Schmersal called The Predator Nominate "Brainiac’s last concerted effort, our last complete thought, before the end.”

The surviving members of Brainiac promoted The Predator Nominate with a brief tour of the United Kingdom as support for Mogwai in February 2023. For the tour, Schmersal replaced Taylor on lead vocals, and guitar duties were handled by Tim Krug.

Track listing

Personnel 
Personnel per liner notes.

Brainiac

 Timmy Taylor –  vocals, synthesizers
 John Schmersal –  guitar
 Juan Monasterio –  bass
 Tyler Trent –  drums

References 

Touch and Go Records EPs
2023 EPs
Demo albums
Brainiac (band) EPs